This article is about the particular significance of the year 1821 to Wales and its people.

Incumbents

Lord Lieutenant of Anglesey – Henry Paget, 1st Marquess of Anglesey 
Lord Lieutenant of Brecknockshire and Monmouthshire – Henry Somerset, 6th Duke of Beaufort
Lord Lieutenant of Caernarvonshire – Thomas Bulkeley, 7th Viscount Bulkeley
Lord Lieutenant of Cardiganshire – William Edward Powell
Lord Lieutenant of Carmarthenshire – George Rice, 3rd Baron Dynevor 
Lord Lieutenant of Denbighshire – Sir Watkin Williams-Wynn, 5th Baronet    
Lord Lieutenant of Flintshire – Robert Grosvenor, 1st Marquess of Westminster 
Lord Lieutenant of Glamorgan – John Crichton-Stuart, 2nd Marquess of Bute 
Lord Lieutenant of Merionethshire – Sir Watkin Williams-Wynn, 5th Baronet
Lord Lieutenant of Montgomeryshire – Edward Clive, 1st Earl of Powis
Lord Lieutenant of Pembrokeshire – Richard Philipps, 1st Baron Milford
Lord Lieutenant of Radnorshire – George Rodney, 3rd Baron Rodney

Bishop of Bangor – Henry Majendie 
Bishop of Llandaff – William Van Mildert
Bishop of St Asaph – John Luxmoore 
Bishop of St Davids – Thomas Burgess

Events
27 July – Sir Thomas Phillipps is created a baronet.
13 September – King George IV of the United Kingdom visits Brecon on his return from Ireland.
November – The first edition of Y Dysgedydd appears.
1 March – The first gas street lighting in Wales is installed at Swansea.
unknown date – William Madocks obtains an Act of Parliament allowing him to build a port, later known as Porthmadog.

Arts and literature

New books
John Elias – Golygiad Ysgrythurol ar Gyfiawnhad Pechadur
Evan Evans (Ieuan Glan Geirionydd) – Pedwar Cyflwr Dyn (translation of a work by Thomas Boston
David Richards (Dafydd Ionawr) – Cywydd y Dilyw

Music
Joseph Harris (Gomer) – Casgliad o Hymnau (collection of hymns)

Births
21 April – Thomas Stephens, historian, literary critic and social reformer (d. 1875) 
1 May – William Latham Bevan, church historian (d. 1908)
24 June – Guillermo Rawson, Argentinian politician (d. 1890)
6 July – Henry Hussey Vivian, 1st Baron Swansea (d. 1894)
16 July – John Jones (Mathetes), preacher and writer (d. 1878)
14 November – John Owen (Owain Alaw), musician (d. 1883)
16 December - John Griffith, journalist writing under the pseudonym Y Gohebydd (d. 1877) 
date unknown - William Davies, politician (d. 1895)

Deaths
16 February – Hugh Davies, botanist, 81
2 March - Benjamin Evans, Independent minister, 81 
2 May – Hester Thrale, diarist, 80
21 May – John Jones (Jac Glan-y-gors), poet and satirist, 54
13 July – Sir Watkin Lewes, lord mayor of London, 81
7 August – Caroline of Brunswick, former Princess of Wales (1795–1820), 53
12 October - William Jones, evangelist, 65 
November – Richard Fenton, poet and author, 74

References

 
Wales
Wales